The 2011 Men's Hockey INSEP Challenge was the second edition of the INSEP Challenge, a men's field hockey tournament. It was held in Paris, France, from July 26 to 31, 2011, and featured five of the top nations in men's field hockey.

Competition format
The tournament featured the national teams of Argentina, Australia, Ireland, South Korea, and the hosts, France, competing in a round-robin format, with each team playing each other once. Three points were awarded for a win, one for a draw, and none for a loss.

Officials
The following umpires were appointed by the International Hockey Federation to officiate the tournament:

 Kim Jung-Yong (KOR)
 Adam Kearns (AUS)
 Eduardo Lizana (ESP)
 Benjamin Mauss (FRA)
 Warren McCully (IRE)
 Maximiliano Scala (ARG)

Results
All times are local (Irish Standard Time).

Preliminary round

Fixtures

Statistics

Final standings

Goalscorers

References

External links
Fédération Française de Hockey

INSEP Challenge
International field hockey competitions hosted by France
Sports competitions in Paris
Hockey INSEP Challenge
Hockey INSEP Challenge